Andrew Williams (1873 – October 28, 1929), nicknamed "String Bean", was a Negro leagues pitcher and manager, playing for many teams, including the Indianapolis ABCs and the Brooklyn Royal Giants.

At age 50 in 1923, Williams made his major league debut for the Brooklyn Royal Giants; to this day, this makes him the oldest debutant in major league history.
By 1926, in Williams later years, one paper appears to list Williams as a submarine pitcher.

Williams received votes listing him on the 1952 Pittsburgh Courier player-voted poll of the Negro Leagues' best players ever.

References

External links 
 and Baseball-Reference Black Baseball stats and Seamheads

Negro league baseball managers
Bacharach Giants players
Brooklyn Royal Giants players
Chicago American Giants players
Dayton Marcos players
Indianapolis ABCs players
Louisville White Sox (1914-1915) players
Pennsylvania Red Caps of New York players
St. Louis Giants players
Washington Potomacs players
West Baden Sprudels players
San Francisco Park players
Baseball players from Illinois
People from Cairo, Illinois
1873 births
1929 deaths
American expatriate baseball players in Cuba
20th-century African-American people